Jiaoqu is a suburban district of the city of Jiamusi, Heilongjiang, People's Republic of China.

Administrative divisions 
Jiao District is divided into 2 subdistricts, 7 towns and 4 townships. 
2 subdistricts
 Jiaxi, Youyi
7 towns
 Dalai, Aoqi, Wangjiang, Zhangfa, Lianjiangkou, Xigemu, Yanjiang
4 townships
 Changqing, Ping'an, Sifeng, Qunsheng

References

Administrative subdivisions of Heilongjiang